James Luckock was born in Birmingham, England, on 24 October 1761, went to school at Winson Green Academy and then travelled in France for some time in order to learn French. When he returned to Birmingham he completed an apprenticeship with Benjamin May, a Birmingham-based plater, and set up a buckle-making business with his brother Joseph. This proved unsuccessful, so James Luckock turned his hand to the jewellery trade and eventually his business in St Paul's Square in Birmingham thrived, having made a profit of £2000 in 1813. He married Mary Richards in July 1795 and together they had four children: Urban, Felix, Howard and Irene.

Luckock became well known in Birmingham for his activities in political and educational reform. He was involved in the development of the Birmingham Brotherly Society in 1796, which trained Sunday-school pupils to become Sunday-school teachers. He was also a founding member of the Birmingham Society for Constitutional Information. During the late 18th and early 19th centuries, Birmingham was globally renowned for button-making, which was considered part of the jewellers' art at the time. Luckock was not an exception in this respect. Birmingham Museums describe him as a "jeweller and button-maker". As well as making buttons, he also collected them, accumulating 500 buttons of different styles, sizes and materials. Most of the buttons in Luckock's collection were made for men's coats or waistcoats, as women's garments did not normally use buttons at the time. The collection was donated to Birmingham Museum and Art Gallery.

References 

1761 births
People from Birmingham, West Midlands
British jewellers
Year of death missing